Pampaqucha (Quechua pampa a large plain, qucha lake also spelled Pampacocha) is a lake in the Andes of Peru. It is located in the Puno Region, Carabaya Province, Ajoyani District. Pampaqucha lies northwest of the peak of Hatun Pinkilluni.

See also 
 Pumaqulluni

References

Lakes of Peru
Lakes of Puno Region